Weightlifting has been part of the Olympic Games program since 1896.

In the sport of weightlifting two lifts are recognised which must be executed in the following sequence:
 the snatch
 the clean and jerk

In the sport of weightlifting, competitions are organised for men and women. The athletes compete in specified bodyweight categories (eight men's and seven women's ) and age groups (Youth: age 13–17 years of age; Junior: 15–20; Senior: over 15 years of age; Masters: over 35).

History 
The Heavy Athletics Federation of Serbia was founded on June 18, 1950, in Belgrade. Its name soon changed to the Serbian Weightlifting Federation.

Serbian Weightlifting Federation continues the tradition of Heavy Athletics Federation of Yugoslavia, the Yugoslav Weightlifting Federation, and the Weightlifting Federation of Serbia and Montenegro, into the International Weightlifting Federation.

Membership 
Serbian Weightlifting Federation is a member of:

International Weightlifting Federation 
European Weightlifting Federation 
Euro-Asian Regional Association for weightlifting 
Mediterranean Weightlifting Confederation
Olympic Committee of Serbia 
Sports Association of Serbia

References 

 Mallon, Bill; & Widlund, Ture (1998). The 1896 Olympic Games. Results for All Competitors in All Events, with Commentary. Jefferson: McFarland.
 Mihajlovic, Milan; Antonijevic, Mihajlo (2006). Dizanje tegova. Savez Srbije za dizanje tegova. Beograd

External links 
 Савез Србије за дизање тегова
 International Weightlifting Federation
 List of IWF Hall of Fame members
 Vladan Mihajlovic - IWF Hall of Fame member
 Golden Plaque SWF

Serbia
Federation
Weightlifting
Organizations based in Belgrade
Sports organizations established in 1950
1950 establishments in Serbia